Yanyuwa or Yanyula may refer to:

Yanyuwa people
Yanyuwa language

Language and nationality disambiguation pages